Fotbal Club Voluntari II, commonly known as FC Voluntari II, or simply as Voluntari II, is the reserve squad of Romanian first league side, FC Voluntari. The squad is currently playing in the Liga III, after achieving the promotion at the end of the 2014–15 season.

History
The team was founded in the summer of 2014 from the desire of having a second senior squad where the players who finished the youth academy could be accommodated with the level of seniors, in the idea of being subsequently promoted to the first squad. The team was enrolled in the Liga IV – Ilfov County where it was crowned as champion after just one season, winning the league, then the playoff tournament. The team qualified for the Liga III promotion play-off where they won without any problems, 9–1 on aggregate against Arsenal Malu, Giurgiu County champions.

After promotion, the second team of FC Voluntari was managed by former notable players such as Tiberiu Bălan, Cosmin Bărcăuan or Dinu Todoran and obtained following rankings: 2015–16 – 3rd of 14, 2016–17 – 4th of 15, 2017–18 – 7th of 14 and 2018–19 – 10th of 16.

Ground

FC Voluntari II plays its home matches on Gheorghe Dincă Stadium, in Voluntari, with a capacity of 1,500 (700 on seats).

Honours
Liga IV – Ilfov County
Winners (1): 2014–15

Players

Second team squad

Out on loan

Club officials

Board of directors

 Last updated: 7 February 2021
 Source:

Current technical staff

 Last updated: 8 March 2022
 Source:

League history

Notable former players
The footballers enlisted below have had international cap(s) for their respective countries at junior and/or senior level and/or played in a fully professional league.

  Cristian Costin
  Robert Gherghe
  Sorin Ispir
  Bogdan Mitache
  Răzvan Petrariu
  Raphael Stănescu
  Vlad Tudorache
  Marius Tudorică
  Adrian Voicu

Notable former managers

  Cosmin Bărcăuan
  Tiberiu Bălan

References

External links
Official website

Association football clubs established in 2014
Football clubs in Ilfov County
Liga III clubs
Liga IV clubs

2014 establishments in Romania